The 2000/01 FIS Nordic Combined World Cup was the 18th world cup season, a combination of ski jumping and cross-country skiing organized by FIS. It started on 2 Dec 2000 in Kuopio, Finland and ended on 10 March 2001 in Oslo, Norway.

Calendar

Men

Team

Standings

Overall 

Standings after 15 events.

Sprint 

Standings after 6 events.

Nations Cup 

Standings after 16 events.

References

External links
FIS Nordic Combined World Cup 2000/01 

2000 in Nordic combined
2001 in Nordic combined
FIS Nordic Combined World Cup